Wicked Man is a compilation album by Eric Burdon, released in 1988.

The studio and live tracks were recorded in 1981 during the Comeback project. The album was re-issued on 14 February 1994.

Critical reception
The Rolling Stone Album Guide wrote: "A certain pathos attends [Burdon's] remake of the Animals' classic 'House of the Rising Sun'—that of a brilliant talent, lost and nearly forgotten."

Track listing

 "Sweet Blood Call" (4:35) (Kent Cooper, Iverson Minter)
 "No More Elmore" (5:22)
 "Do You Feel It" (3:30)
 "Wicked Man" (3:10)
 "The Road" (4:46)
 "Devil's Daughter" (4:05) (Iverson Minter)
 "Crawling King Snake" (2:19)
 "Who Gives a Fuck" (4:43)
 "House of the Rising Sun" (4:56)
 "Comeback" (2:06)

References

Eric Burdon albums
1988 compilation albums